The Olympia Leisure Centre is a swimming pool in Dundee, Scotland. It is currently closed for repair work.

History 
The building was constructed to replace the original Olympia Leisure Centre and is situated on a former car park. Construction began in January 2011 and was due to be completed in September 2012 with a budget of £31.5 million. The main contractor was Balfour Beatty.

The pool opened in June 2013. An official opening by Shona Robison was held in September 2013.

In September 2021, problems were identified with light fixings, resulting in the closure of the pool in October. Initially the operators stated it would remain closed at least until the following week to allow work to take place. On 10 November the operators stated it would be closed until further notice. Further investigations following the closure found more structural issues. A £4.5 million repair program was launched which is expected to be completed by late 2022.

Facilities 
The Centre includes a 50 metre variable-depth pool, wave pool, rapids, and a fitness suite. There is also a cafe, and a multi-storey car park.

References 

2013 establishments in Scotland
Swimming venues in Scotland
Sports venues in Dundee
Sports venues completed in 2013